The 25th Anniversary Cup was a stand-alone cup competition organized to celebrate the 25th anniversary of the Israeli Declaration of Independence.

The competition was played at the end of the 1972–73 season, while the national football team was involved in the 1974 FIFA World Cup qualification. The cup was played as two competitions, for Liga Leumit and for Liga Alef.

The Liga Leumit Cup was won by Maccabi Petah Tikva, who had beaten Maccabi Haifa in the final on penalties. The Liga Alef Cup was won by Hapoel Yehud, having beaten Hapoel Ramat Gan 2–0 in the final.

Liga Leumit Cup

Group A

Group B

Group C

Group D

Semi-finals

Final

Liga Alef Cup
The Liga Alef cup contested by the top 8 clubs in each division of 1972–73 Liga Alef.

Group A

Group B

Group C

Group D

Semi-finals

Final

References
100 Years of Football 1906–2006, Elisha Shohat (Israel), 2006

Anniversary Cup
Predecessors